Venture or Masansa is a populated place in the Copperbelt area of Zambia.

References

Populated places in Copperbelt Province